Wilmington College is a private college in Wilmington, Ohio. It was established by the Religious Society of Friends (Quakers) in 1870 and is accredited by the Higher Learning Commission. The college is still Quaker affiliated and has seven core Quaker values. In fall 2018, the college set an enrollment record, bringing in 450 new students for the academic year, totaling 1,103 students on Wilmington's main campus, and 139 students at Wilmington's two Cincinnati branches at Blue Ash and Cincinnati State.

History

In 1863 three brothers, Hugh, James, and Thomas Garvin founded Franklin College in Albany, Ohio. After two years in Albany, the college was relocated to Wilmington, where the cornerstone of College Hall was laid on 4 July 1866. The institution was closed in 1868 following the Civil War. In 1870 the half-completed Franklin College building went up for auction. The building and 33 surrounding acres were purchased by the Religious Society of Friends (Quakers). Lewis Estes was named the first president. Following a few years of economic struggle, Estes resigned. Benjamin Trueblood, a 26-year-old recent Earlham College graduate, was named the new president. In 1875, Wilmington College graduated its first class of four students, three females, and one male. South Hall (razed 1956) was the college's first dorm in 1876, and in 1904 the college purchased a former boarding house and named it Twin Ash Hall (demolished 1984).

In 1917, Wilmington College acquired the Lebanon National Normal School in Lebanon, Ohio.

In 1944, under President S. Arthur Watson, the college was accredited by the Higher Learning Commission and joined the North Central Association of Colleges. Following WWII, Wilmington College saw a huge boost in growth. Under President Samuel Marble, Marble Hall (1950) was constructed by students. This was due to the large boost in the middle class following WWII and the creation of the G.I. Bill. Also built by students were The Pyle Student Center (1957) and Friends Hall (1955). The current gymnasium, Herman Court was constructed in 1966.

Today, President Trevor Bates, the first African-American president, is head of the college. The college has 25 majors, 27 minors, and 32 concentrations. As well as three graduate programs. There are 18 intercollegiate sports in the NCAA Div-III. The campus features over 50 student-led organizations.

Presidents
Lewis A. Estes: 1871-1874
Benjamin Franklin Trueblood: 1874-1879
David Dennis: 1879-1881
James Unthank: 1881-1903
Albert Brown: 1903-1912
Samuel Hodgin: 1912-1915
J Edwin Jay: 1915-1927
Henry Williams: 1927-1928
Beverly Skinner: 1928-1931
Walter Collins: 1932-1940
Sheppard Arthur Watson: 1940-1947
Samuel Marble: 1947-1959
W Brooke Morgan: 1959-1960*
James Read: 1960-1969
W Brooke Morgan: 1969-1970*
Robert Hinshaw: 1971-1975
Neil Thorburn: 1982-1995
Daniel A. DiBiasio: 1995-2011
James Reynolds: 2012-2020
Erika Goodwin: 2020*
Trevor Bates: 2021–present
Indicates interim/acting president*

Academics
Wilmington College offers undergraduate programs and three Masters' programs. The college's Watson Library is a member of the Ohio Private Academic Libraries (OPAL) consortium and the OhioLINK consortium that provides an integrated catalog, e-resources, and more than 100 research databases.

Campuses
Wilmington, Ohio (Main Campus)
Blue Ash, Ohio (Wilmington College Blue Ash Campus)
Cincinnati State (Cincinnati State Campus)

Main campus

Academic buildings

 College Hall (1869): Historic building present at Wilmington College's founding in 1870. Houses classrooms, faculty offices, offices of Admission, Financial Aid, the President's Office, and Academic Affairs. Added to National Register of Historic Places in 1972.
 Bailey Hall (1908): Began as a science building for the college, and later renovated into student housing. Renovated to become home of the college's science programs once again temporarily during ongoing renovations to Kettering Hall. 
 S. Arthur Watson Library (1941): The college library, named for former College president S. Arthur Watson. The building is home to the college archives, OhioLink, OPAL, and study space for students.
Thomas R. Kelly Religious Center (1962): Kelly Religious Center houses the Campus Friends Meeting, The Office of Campus Ministry, faculty offices, classrooms, and the offices of the Wilmington Yearly Meeting.
Robinson Communication Center (1992): Houses the Academic Resource Center, computer labs, photography labs and studios, the Communication Arts Department, and student publication offices.
Oscar F. Boyd Cultural Arts Center (2005): Features David and June Harcum Art Gallery, the WC Theatre Department, 440-seat Hugh Heiland Theatre, Meriam R. Hare Quaker Heritage Center, T. Canby Jones Meetinghouse, and two-story academic wing with classrooms and faculty offices.
 Center for Sport Sciences (2015): Houses the college's nationally recognized Athletic Training program, indoor and outdoor practice facilities for all athletic teams, and offices for Drayer Physical Therapy Institute, Beacon Orthopedics and Sport Medicine, and chiropractic offices.
Center for the Sciences & Agriculture: Includes the renovated 34,000 square-foot former Kettering Science Hall and a 13,500 square-foot addition. The facility hosts 10 classrooms, 10 laboratories, three research labs, two 100-seat lecture halls and 30 offices.

Peace Resource Center
The Peace Resource Center (PRC) at Wilmington College creates a vital connection between the Quaker mission and vision of Wilmington College and national and international efforts toward non-violence, social justice, and peace.

The PRC is the home of the unique archives, “The Barbara Reynolds Memorial Archives”, which is one of the most extensive collections in the United States focusing on the human experience of nuclear war through the atomic bombings of Hiroshima and Nagasaki, Japan on August 6 and 9, 1945. 

The PRC was founded in 1975 by the Quaker peace activist Barbara Leonard Reynolds (1915-1990) who worked to create a world free of nuclear weaponry and war and to providing ways for atomic bombing survivors share their stories of the tragedy of military conflict. In the late 1950s, Barbara and her husband Earle Reynolds became icons of the global peace and antinuclear movement after sailing their yacht the Phoenix of Hiroshima into the US nuclear test site Cedar under Operation Hardtack I near the Marshall Islands in the Pacific Ocean.

The Peace Resource Center’s non-violence, social justice, and global peace programming, as well as its priceless archives and collection of historical documents, makes it a unique “Hands On” space that promotes and affirms peace as a core value of the Wilmington College mission.

Residence halls
 Denver Hall (1925): Historic residence hall for fifty students.
 Marble Hall (1948): Residence hall built by students led by College president Samuel Marble. The building was dedicated with an Ohio Historical Marker in 2013.
 Friends Hall (1955): Residence halls in the center of campus for men and women.
 Austin Pickett Hall (1965): Two large joining buildings housing freshman residence halls. 
 Campus Village (1998): Apartment-style residence buildings 
 College Commons (2001): Townhouse units for upperclassmen

Greek life
Wilmington College recognizes thirteen Greek Letter Organizations: three national fraternities, three local fraternities, two national sororities and three local sororities, and two auxiliaries. This group of thirteen Greek organizations constitutes the membership of the Greek Council. Additionally, Wilmington College boasts several honor societies, some international in scope.

Men's organizations
Active chapters in bold, inactive chapters italicized.
(NIC) indicates members of the North American Interfraternity Conference.
(NPHC) indicates members of the National Pan-Hellenic Council.

Sigma Zeta (ΣΖ), 1916 – local fraternity (not to be confused with the STEM honorary of the same name)
Tau Kappa Beta (ΤΚΒ), 1948 – local fraternity
Delta Theta Sigma (ΔΘΣ), 1983 – national, with agricultural affinity
Lambda Chi Alpha (ΛΧΑ), 2008 – International fraternity
FarmHouse (FH), 2019 – international fraternity (NIC)
Gamma Phi Gamma (ΓΦΓ), 1907-2014(suspended)(returned) 2022 - local fraternity
Phi Alpha Psi (ΦΑΨ), 1972-20xx – local fraternity (Inactive)
Iota Phi Theta (ΙΦΘ), 1984-20xx – international fraternity (NPHC and NIC) (Inactive)

Women's organizations
Active chapters in bold, inactive chapters italicized.
(NPC) indicates members of the National Panhellenic Conference.
(NPHC) indicates members of the National Pan-Hellenic Council.
Delta Omega Theta (ΔΩΘ), 1907 – local sorority
Alpha Phi Kappa (ΑΦΚ), 1921 – local sorority
Psi Beta Omega (ΨΒΩ), 1978 – local sorority
Delta Theta Sigma Lil Sis (ΔΘΣ sisters), 1984 – auxiliary, operates as a sorority
Phi Alpha Psi Sweethearts (ΦΑΨ sisters), 1985 – auxiliary, operates as a sorority
Kappa Delta (ΚΔ), 2009 – national sorority (NPC)
Sigma Gamma Rho (ΣΓΡ), 2017 – national sorority (NPHC)
Iota SweetHearts (ΙΦΘ sisters), 19xx-2014? – national auxiliary for ΙΦΘ

Honor societies
Active chapters in bold, inactive chapters italicized.
(ACHS) indicates members of the Association of College Honor Societies.
Omicron Delta Epsilon (ΟΔΕ), 1991 – economics honors (ACHS)
Sigma Tau Delta (ΣΤΔ), 19xx – English honors (ACHS)
Sigma Delta Pi (ΣΔΠ), 19xx – Hispanic culture and Spanish language honors (ACHS)
Delta Tau Alpha (ΔΤΑ), 19xx – agriculture honors (ACHS)
Phi Alpha Theta (ΦΑΘ), 1972-20xx – history honors (ACHS)

Athletics

Wilmington College athletic teams are known as the "Fightin' Quakers". Their colors are dark green and lime green. The Quakers compete at the NCAA Division III level and have been a member of the Ohio Athletic Conference (OAC) since 2000.

Wilmington College offers nine men's teams and nine women's teams, including

Men's sports
Baseball
Basketball
Cross Country
Football
Soccer
Track & Field (Indoor & Outdoor)
Lacrosse
Swimming
Wrestling

Women's sports
Basketball
Cross Country
Equestrian
Soccer
Softball
Track & Field (Indoor & Outdoor)
Swimming
Volleyball

Coed sports
Cheerleading

Before becoming a member of the NCAA, Wilmington's teams competed in the NAIA. 
Wilmington was previously a member of the Association of Mideast Colleges from 1990 to 1996 and served as an independent until 1998. 
WC was in the Heartland Collegiate Athletic Conference from 1998 to 1999, before joining the OAC in 2000. Wilmington's conference opponents include: Baldwin Wallace University, Capital University, Heidelberg University, John Carroll University, Marietta College, University of Mount Union, Muskingum University, Ohio Northern University, and Otterbein University.

National champions
Wilmington has had 6 individual National Champions, as well as one team National Championship.
 Christian Patterson: 2014 NCAA Division III outdoor high-jump 
 Ashley Johnson: 2006 NCAA Division III polevault 
 Doreen Nagawa: 2005 NCAA Division III triple-jump 
 Emily Herring: 2004 NCAA Division III indoor high-jump
 Women's Basketball: 2004 NCAA Division III National Champions
 Jimmy Wallace: 2002 NCAA Division III Wrestling
 Nyhla Rothwell: 1997 NCAA Division III indoor high-jump
 Callen Martin: 2010 NCAA Division III 55-meter dash indoor

National tournament appearances
Men's Basketball: '10, '14
Women's Basketball: '02, '03, '04, '07, '08
Men's Soccer: '80, '81, '82, '83, '84, '86, '87, '89, '96, '99, '00, '01, '04
Women's Soccer: '85, '86, '94, '00, '02, '03
Football: '80, '82, '83

Conference champions-NCAA Era
Men's Basketball: '10, '14
Women's Basketball:'92, '99, '98, '00, '99 '02, '03, '05, '07, '08
Men's Soccer:'92, '93, '94, '95, '98, '99, '00, '04
Women's Soccer:'93, '94, '95, '98, '99, '00, '02, '03
Men's Track & Field: '01
Women's Track & Field: '99, '00, '01

Notable Quaker athletics alumni
Bill Ramseyer: Football Coach, 1972–1990 / Athletic Director, 1975–1988
Kirk Mee '61: Baseball, Football, Track
Charles "Shifty" Bolen: Football Coach, 1923–29
Bud Lewis, Soccer Coach 1975–2017
Peter Nilsson: Soccer, 1997, represented Västra Frölunda IF in the 1999 Allsvenskan

Cincinnati Bengals
Wilmington College was the location of summer training camp for the Cincinnati Bengals of the National Football League from the team's first season in 1968 through 1996, when the team moved camp to Georgetown College in Georgetown, Kentucky.

Notable alumni
 Willis Todhunter Ballard '26, Western novelist
 Thomas Raymond Kelly '13, Quaker Theologian & Author
 J. Brent Bill '73, American author
 Tom Blackburn, head men's basketball coach at the University of Dayton 1947 – 1964
 Satch Davidson '58, Major League baseball umpire
 Joseph Haines Moore 1897, American astronomer
 Stanley Plumly '62, a Guggenheim award and multiple Pushcart Prize-winning author, and Poet Laureate for the state of Maryland
 André De Shields, Emmy Award and Tony Award-winning American actor
 Gary Sandy, star of the television series WKRP in Cincinnati
 Arthur R. M. Spaid 1893, American educator, school administrator, lecturer, and writer
 Michelle Gorelow, Member of the Nevada Assembly
 From Lebanon University which merged with Wilmington College in 1917
 Stanley P. V. Arnold, an Illinois state representative and newspaper editor
 Horatio C. Claypool, United States Representative from Ohio
 Myers Y. Cooper, former Governor of Ohio
 Clement L. Brumbaugh, United States Representative from Ohio
 Francis B. De Witt, United States Representative from Ohio
 Lucien J. Fenton, United States Representative from Ohio
 William T. Fitzgerald, United States Representative from Ohio
 John W. Harreld, United States Representative and Senator from Oklahoma
 Cordell Hull, United States Senator from Tennessee and Secretary of State under President Franklin D. Roosevelt
 James R. Keaton, Justice of the Oklahoma Territorial Supreme Court.
 Isaac C. Ketler, Presbyterian scholar, founder of Grove City College
 Andrew Armstrong Kincannon, Chancellor of the University of Mississippi
 Monroe Henry Kulp, United States Representative from Pennsylvania
 John J. Lentz, United States Representative from Ohio
 John A. McDowell, United States Representative from Ohio
 Thomas Corwin Mendenhall, autodidact physicist and meteorologist
 Stephen Morgan, United States Representative from Ohio
 Will E. Neal, United States Representative from West Virginia
 Miner G. Norton, United States Representative from Ohio
 James D. Post, United States Representative from Ohio
 John M. Robsion, United States Representative and Senator from Kentucky
 F. E. Riddle (judge), Attorney and Associate Justice of the Oklahoma Supreme Court
 Addison E. Southard, American diplomat
 W. D. Twichell (Class of 1883, civil engineering), Texas surveyor
 George M. Wertz, United States Representative from Pennsylvania
 Edward E. Moore, Indiana state senator and Los Angeles City Council member
 Mary Creegan Roark, first female president of Eastern Kentucky University

References

External links
 
 Official athletics website

 
Private universities and colleges in Ohio
Educational institutions established in 1870
Quaker universities and colleges
Peace education
Greater Cincinnati Consortium of Colleges and Universities
Education in Clinton County, Ohio
Buildings and structures in Clinton County, Ohio
Tourist attractions in Clinton County, Ohio
1870 establishments in Ohio